Not Quite Paradise is a 1985 British comedy-drama directed by Lewis Gilbert.  It was originally released in Europe under the title Not Quite Jerusalem, adapted by Paul Kember from his 1982 play of the same name.

It was filmed on two kibbutzim, Eilot and Grofit, as well as at the Mikveh Israel Agricultural School.

Plot
Six naive British and American volunteers arrive on kibbutz Kfar Ezra for a working holiday, exchanging their labour for the opportunity to experience first-hand its unique collective lifestyle. When Mike (Sam Robards), a young medical student, falls in love with Gila (Joanna Pacuła), the Israeli girl who is organising the volunteers' work and accommodation, he must choose between a life with her and returning home.

Cast

Critical reception
Not Quite Paradise received very poor reviews. Nina Darnton of The New York Times panned the film as "an example of a good idea spoiled by a hackneyed, heavy-handed script, awkward directorial pacing, and posed acting... The script, while trying to humorously characterize national stereotypes, succeeds only in being insulting." Joe Baltake of Philly.com called it "annoyingly schizophrenic – thuddingly humorless when it isn't shockingly offensive." In a savage review in the Los Angeles Times, Patrick Goldstein argued that an "awkward" and "uneven" script, "a paucity of intriguing characters", and an overwrought soundtrack of quivering violins "delivers a dreary, cliché-ridden film with all the wallop of a sheaf of crumbling parchment paper."

London's Time Out contrasted the "strong material" in Paul Kember's original play to this melodramatic, "caramelized" screen version: "Gilbert has created a toffee-apple with the apple removed: bite through the sweet crust of romantic Holy Land locations, handsome Israelis, dashing Arab terrorists and corny jokes, and what remains is sheer emptiness." TV Guide was equally dismissive, noting, "the world of an Israeli kibbutz is reduced to a few simple-minded cinematic clichés... no different from a boarding school or overnight camp. The only really indigenous thing to be found here is the beautifully photographed Israeli scenery, which borders on travelog material rather than background setting."

References

External links

 

1985 films
Films about the kibbutz
Films directed by Lewis Gilbert
British films based on plays
British comedy-drama films
Films shot in Israel
New World Pictures films
1980s English-language films
1980s British films